John Bresee (February 21, 1966 – June 29, 2019) was a Utah-based entrepreneur and co-founder of Backcountry.com, as well as a writer, editor, and entrepreneur coach.

Business
He was a co-founder of Backcountry.com, one of the first internet-based outdoor gear retailers in 1996 while living in Park City, Utah. Bresee and Jim Holland sold Backcountry.com to Liberty Media and John C. Malone in 2007. He was also director of e-commerce for Cellmania, an infrastructure company for mobile commerce applications funded by Motorola. Cellmania was acquired by Blackberry in 2013.

Writer and editor
Bresee founded The Wasatch Canyon Reporter, a Wasatch Range skiing newsletter, while working at Snowbird Resort. He later became a managing editor and writer for Powder Magazine. Additionally, his work has appeared in Skiing, Outside, Newsweek, and Gravity.

References

Businesspeople from Utah